The Pokegama River is a  river in Wisconsin and Minnesota in the United States.  It is a tributary of the Saint Louis River, joining it in the western part of the city of Superior, Wisconsin.

See also
List of rivers of Minnesota

References

External links
Minnesota Watersheds
USGS Hydrologic Unit Map - State of Minnesota (1974)

Rivers of Minnesota
Rivers of Wisconsin
Rivers of Douglas County, Wisconsin